Inia Batikoto Seruiratu is a Fijian politician and member of the Parliament of Fiji for the FijiFirst party. He has served as the Opposition Leader since 8 March 2023. He served as the Minister for Rural, Maritime Development and Disaster Management from 2020 to 2022, and Minister for Defence, National Security and Policing from 2018 to 2022.

Seruiratu was first elected to Parliament at the 2014 Fijian general election and appointed Minister for Agriculture and Natural Disaster Management.

He was re-elected in 2018 with 1,251 votes, and appointed Minister of Defence and National Security. In January 2019 he was appointed as Minister of Foreign Affairs. In April 2020 the Foreign Affairs portfolio returned to Prime Minister Frank Bainimarama, and Seruiratu was instead appointed Minister for Rural and Maritime Development and Minister for Disaster Management.

On April 28, 2020, Seruiratu delivered a speech celebrating the first arrival of Fiji's recently commissioned RFNS Savenaca to its homeport of Walu Bay.

Seruiratu often communicates with Fijians through his social media posts on Twitter and Facebook.

References

living people
I-Taukei Fijian members of the Parliament of Fiji
FijiFirst politicians
Fijian civil servants
Government ministers of Fiji
Defense ministers of Fiji
Foreign Ministers of Fiji
Politicians from Tailevu Province
Year of birth missing (living people)